The 2004 NCAA Division I-AA football season, part of college football in the United States organized by the National Collegiate Athletic Association at the Division I-AA level, began on August 28, 2004, and concluded with the 2004 NCAA Division I-AA Football Championship Game on December 17, 2004, at Finley Stadium in Chattanooga, Tennessee. James Madison won their first I-AA championship, defeating Montana by a final score of 31−21.

Conference changes and new programs
Prior to the season, the Great West Conference was formed as a football-only conference for six unaffiliated teams from California, Colorado, North Dakota, South Dakota, and Utah. A seventh member, St. Mary's (CA), dropped their football program before the start of the season.

I-AA team wins over I-A teams
 September 4  – Florida Atlantic 35, Hawaii 28 OT
 September 11 – Florida Atlantic 20, North Texas 13
 September 11 – New Hampshire 35, Rutgers 24
 September 18 – Florida Atlantic 27, Middle Tennessee 20
 September 18 – Maine 9, Mississippi State 7
 September 25 – Eastern Illinois 31, Eastern Michigan 28

Conference standings

Postseason

NCAA Division I-AA playoff bracket

* Denotes host institution

References